St Kyneburgh's Chapel was established in early times near the City of Gloucester. It was dedicated to St Kyneburgh and was transferred with all its lands to Llanthony Secunda Priory by Roger Earl of Hereford between 1143 and 1155. It was situated inside Gloucester's city wall at the south gate. It was formerly a possession of St Owen's Church, Gloucester.

References

Churches in Gloucester